1971 in Korea may refer to:
1971 in North Korea
1971 in South Korea